Fistball competition at the World Games 2009 were held from July 17 to July 20 at the Chung Cheng Martial Arts Stadium in Kaohsiung, Taiwan.

Schedule

Medal table

Results

Preliminaries

Second phase

Rankings

2009 World Games
2009